Francis Esdale Schryver,  (31 October 1888 – 3 February 1965) was an Australian soldier and swimmer. He competed for Australasia at the 1912 Summer Olympics in the men's 200 metre breaststroke and the men's 400 metre breaststroke. In doing so, he became the first Western Australian to represent Australia at an Olympic Games.

Schryver also served with the Australian Imperial Force in the First World War. A stretcher-bearer with the 2nd Australian Stationary Hospital for much of the war, he was awarded the Distinguished Conduct Medal and Military Medal for bravery on the Western Front.

References

1888 births
1965 deaths
Australian Army soldiers
Australian male breaststroke swimmers
Australian military personnel of World War I
Australian Army personnel of World War II
Australian recipients of the Distinguished Conduct Medal
Australian recipients of the Military Medal
Olympic swimmers of Australasia
Swimmers from Perth, Western Australia
Swimmers at the 1912 Summer Olympics